Mohamed Mhadhebi (born 7 August 1990) is a retired Tunisian football midfielder.

References

1990 births
Living people
Tunisian footballers
CA Bizertin players
Espérance Sportive de Tunis players
CS Hammam-Lif players
Association football midfielders
Tunisian Ligue Professionnelle 1 players
Footballers from Tunis